The Eendracht (Concord) was an early 17th century Dutch wooden-hulled 700 tonne East Indiaman, launched in 1615 in the service of the Dutch East India Company (VOC). Its Dutch name means "concord", "unity" or "union", and was a common name given to Dutch ships of the period, from the motto of the Republic: Concordia res parvae crescunt ("Eendracht maakt macht" / "Unity makes strength"). The ship was captained by Dirk Hartog when he made the second recorded landfall by a European on Australian soil, in 1616.

First voyage to the East Indies

Departure from Holland
Upon its commissioning, the Eendracht entered the service of the Dutch East India Company (Vereenigde Oostindische Compagnie, or VOC).

For her maiden voyage on the open ocean, the Eendracht set sail on 23 January 1616 from the Dutch port of Texel in the company of several other VOC ships, on a trading venture bound for Batavia in the Dutch East Indies (the present-day Jakarta). Her captain was Dirk Hartog, a thirty-five-year-old former private merchant, who had sailed for the VOC before but was now again in the employ of the VOC.

Route to Indian Ocean
Sailing down the west Africa coastline, the Eendracht became separated from the others in a horrible storm and reached the Cape of Good Hope alone around August. She stayed there until 27 August when Hartog decided to set out unaccompanied across the Indian Ocean towards their destination.

Hartog's course across the Indian Ocean was a much more southerly one than the route usually followed. It made use of the prevailing westerly winds at those latitudes known as the "Roaring Forties", a route which had been pioneered a few years earlier by the Dutch navigator Hendrik Brouwer, who had noted it to be a faster way to reach Java. By this time, the VOC had not as yet instructed all its captains to take advantage of this route, which could reduce the overall traveling time from Europe by a good six months. The decision to do so was taken just a few months after Hartog departed Amsterdam.  So Hartog took that decision himself.  However, later the intention was to change heading northwards at a more westerly longitude than the Eendracht had done. Whether Hartog had intended to maintain such a southerly course for so long via this route, or was perhaps blown a little off course, is unclear.

Landfall in Australia
After approximately two months at sea, on 25 October Hartog and the Eendracht unexpectedly sighted land"various islands, which were, however, found uninhabited", at a latitude around 26° South. These islands and the nearby land were previously unknown to Europeans, and the Eendracht had become the second recorded European ship to visit the continent of Australia, having been preceded (albeit, on the opposite side of the continent) 10 years earlier by Willem Janszoon on the  sailing along, and landing on, the western shores of the Cape York Peninsula just months before Luís Vaz de Torres sailed through the straight that now bears his name without leaving records of seeing land on his south.

Hartog and crew made landfall on the island, now known as Dirk Hartog Island which lies off Shark Bay in Western Australia. This was the first recorded landing on the western coastline by a European. The island was uninhabited, and Hartog spent three days there, finding nothing of great interest or value to him or his company.

Before departing on 27 October, Hartog left behind a pewter dish affixed to a post set in a rock cleft (now called Cape Inscription), upon which he had inscribed the following brief account of his visit:
1616 On 25 October arrived the ship Eendracht, of Amsterdam: Supercargo Gilles Miebais of Liege, skipper Dirch Hatichs of Amsterdam. on 27 d[itt]o. she set sail again for Bantam. Deputy supercargo Jan Stins, upper steersman Pieter Doores of Bil. In the year 1616.
It lay unmolested in situ for a further eighty years, until it was re-discovered half-buried (the post had rotted away) by a Dutch expedition of three ships under the command of the Flemish captain Willem de Vlamingh in 1697. De Vlamingh had earlier explored Rottnest Island and the Swan River (later to be the site of the city of Perth), and had been making his way up the western coast of Australia. He replaced the Hartog dish with one of his own, onto which he copied Hartog's original inscription and added an account of his own landing, installing it in the same spot nailed to a cypress-pine trunk taken from Rottnest. Hartog's original dish returned with De Vlamingh later to Amsterdam, where it is displayed in the Rijksmuseum.

Charting the coast of Western Australia

After leaving the island, the Eendracht sailed in a north-west direction along the Western Australian coastline, Hartog charting as he went. He gave this land the name t'Landt van d'Eendracht or "Eendrachtsland", after his ship.

In 1627 this name appeared on the Caert van't Landt van d'Eendracht and on subsequent charts, replacing the former mythical and postulated land of Terra Australis Incognita (South Land), sparking considerable further interest by parties such as the Dutch East India Company. This gave further impetus to explore this region in the hope of something notable or exploitable, leading to a long period of further exploration. Hartog's name Eendrachtsland was at first being retained for just the part he visited, when the continent he was then thought to have visited was named Nova Hollandia (New Holland)  by Abel Tasman in 1644 when further unveiled by him on two expeditions during the previous two years.

Hartog himself did not note anything which might be of use, making no further landfalls or contact with Aboriginal Australians inhabiting the land. The Eendracht continued along the coast to about 22° South latitude, thereafter heading northwards toward the Timor Sea. She arrived first at Makassar on the island of Sulawesi on 14 December 1616 where a conflict with the local chief, caused the ship to leave for Ambon where it arrived 6 days later. 
Some excerpts of a letter from Supercargo, Cornelis Buysero at Bantam to the Managers of the East India Company at Amsterdam, with comments from author, Jan Heeres in 1899, is of interest to the history of the Eendracht, as follows.

Worshipful, Wise, Provident, very Discreet Gentlemen,...

...The ship Eendracht [*], with which they had sailed from the
Netherlands, after communicating at the Cabo sailed away from them so
far southward as to come upon 6 various islands which were, however,
found uninhabited [**]...

[* Commanded by Dirk Hartogs, or Hartogszoon.]

[* What "uninhabited islands" the ship Eendracht "came upon", Buysero's
letter does not say. Various authentic archival documents of 1618 and
subsequent years, however, go to show that the land afterwards named
Eendrachtsland or Land van de Eendracht, and the Dirk Hartogsreede
(island) must have been discovered on this voyage.]

Bantam, this last day of August, A.D. 1617.
Your Worships' servant to command
CORNELIS BUYSERO [*]

[* Buysero was supercargo at Bantam (DE JONGE, Opkcornst, IV, p. 68,) and
was therefore likely to be well informed as to the adventures of the
ship, which had sailed from the Netherlands in January 1616, departed
from the Cape of Good Hope in the last days of August, and had arrived in
India in December of the same year, as appears from what Steven Van der
Haghen, Governor of Amboyna, writes May 26, 1617: "That in the month of
December 1616, the ship Eendracht entered the narrows between Bima and
the land of Endea near Guno Api (Goenoeng Api) in the south of Java"
(Sapi Straits).]

It proves that as early as 1618 the name of Eendrachtsland was known in
the Netherlands.

The Willems River discovery added to the boundary of Eendrachtsland in 1618, as shown by the prominence given to Eendrachtsland as the main name on the chart as the name for this South-land. The text on this close-up cropped image says, Willems revier, besocht by 't volck van 't Schip Mauritius in Iulius A° 1618 ("Willem's River, visited by the crew of the ship Mauritius in July 1618").

Return voyage to the Netherlands
The Eendracht remained in the East Indies for about a year, possibly engaging in local commercial ventures.

On 17 December 1617 she again set sail for the return voyage home, leaving the port of Bantam and bound for Zeeland in the Dutch Republic, with Dirk Hartog again as her master. This voyage proved to be relatively uneventful, and she arrived back in the Netherlands on 16 October 1618 after a period of some ten months at sea. Captain Hartog left the service of the VOC shortly after the return, to resume private trading ventures in the Baltic. He died a few years later.

Second voyage to the East Indies
On 13 May 1619 the Eendracht again left port at Texel, bound a second time for Batavia and the East Indies. She rounded the Cape of Good Hope on 26 November, and reached her destination on 22 March 1620 without recorded incident, a journey of some ten months.

Shipwreck
She apparently remained in the East Indies, until 13 May 1622, where on a local trading voyage she is recorded as having been wrecked and lost off the western coast of Ambon Island in the central Moluccas. She had aboard a cargo of coins, and her wreck has not been recovered.

References

Further reading
 
  Originally accessed 8 July 2005, archived 2 December 2005.
  (in Dutch)

1610s ships
Maritime incidents in 1622
Ships lost with all hands
Lost sailing vessels
Shark Bay
Exploration ships of the Dutch Republic
European exploration of Australia
Ships of the Dutch East India Company